Angus L.K. McKelvey (born in 1968 in Honolulu, Hawaii) is an American politician and a Democratic member of the Hawaii House of Representatives since January 2007 representing District 10.

Education
McKelvey earned his BA in political science from Whittier College and his JD from Concord Law School

Elections
2012 McKelvey won the August 11, 2012 Democratic Primary with 1,329 votes (66.8%), and won the November 6, 2012 General election with 4,255 votes (63.9%) against Republican nominee Chayne Marten.
2006 Challenging incumbent Democratic Representative Kam Tanaka for the District 10 seat, McKelvey won the September 26, 2006 Democratic Primary with 1,360 votes (59.3%), and won the November 7, 2006 General election with 2,623 votes (54.4%) against Republican nominee Ben Azman, who had run for Hawaii Senate in 2002.
2008 McKelvey was unopposed for the September 20, 2008 Democratic Primary, winning with 1,286 votes, and won the November 4, 2008 General election with 4,477 votes (60.8%) against Republican nominee Ramon Madden.
2010 McKelvey was unopposed for the September 18, 2010 Democratic Primary, winning with 1,757 votes, and his 2008 opponent, Republican Ramon Madden, won the Republican Primary, setting up a rematch. McKelvey won the November 2, 2010 General election with 3,191 votes (61.0%) against Madden.

References

External links
Official page at the Hawaii State Legislature
 

Date of birth missing (living people)
Living people
Democratic Party members of the Hawaii House of Representatives
People from Lahaina, Hawaii
Politicians from Honolulu
Whittier College alumni
1968 births
21st-century American politicians